The 1952 BYU Cougars football team was an American football team that represented Brigham Young University (BYU) as a member of the Skyline Conference during the 1952 college football season. In their fourth season under head coach Chick Atkinson, the Cougars compiled an overall record of 4–6 with a mark of 3–4 against conference opponents, finished fifth in the Skyline, and were outscored by a total of 240 to 154.

The team's statistical leaders included Reed Stolworthy with 436 rushing yards and Dick Felt with 42 points scored. Felt set a BYU record that still stands with four touchdowns in the fourth quarter against San Jose State on November 7, 1952.

Schedule

References

BYU
BYU Cougars football seasons
BYU Cougars football